The Hidden Land is the eighth studio album and twelfth album overall released by Béla Fleck and the Flecktones, released in 2006. It was recorded before the band's year-long hiatus during 2005 and released afterward. The Hidden Land won the 2007 Grammy Award for Best Contemporary Jazz Album.

Reception 

This record sings only in a couple of places. The rest is 'serious Flecktones.' Perhaps this determination is simply not for most of us. It's easy to accept that, especially when those serious Flecktones fans will be debating individual musical passages until the next album is released." Devin Grant of No Depression wrote: "Fleck keeps things centered, wielding his banjo in directions the instrument wasn’t originally envisioned to go."

Track listing
All songs by Béla Fleck unless otherwise noted.
"Fugue from Prelude/Fugue No. 20 in A minor, BWV 889" (J.S. Bach, arr. The Flecktones) – 1:51
"P'Lod In The House" (Future Man/B. Fleck) – 3:46
"Rococo" – 3:46
"Labyrinth" – 6:21
"Kaleidoscope" (The Flecktones) – 5:08
"Who's Got Three?" – 5:22
"Weed Whacker" – 7:44
"Couch Potato" – 3:03
"Chennai" (Jeff Coffin/B. Fleck) – 5:48
"Subterfuge" – 4:04
Interlude (The Flecktones) – 0:39
"Misunderstood" – 7:27
"The Whistle Tune" – 4:54

Personnel
Béla Fleck -  1937 Style 75 Gibson Mastertone banjo (tracks 1, 7, 8, 13), 1936 Style 18 Gibson Top Tension gut string banjo (track 3), 2004 Deering Tenbrooks banjo (track 5), 1932 Vega-Vox Deluxe banjo (track 6), Deering Crossfire electric banjo (tracks 2, 9), 1967 Rickenbacker 5-string electric banjo (track 10, 11), Deering 6-String bantar (tracks 11, 12), Paradis stereo guitar (track 4), synth (track 9)
Jeff Coffin - Soprano saxophone (tracks 2, 5, 7, 8, 11), tenor saxophone (tracks 4, 10, 12), alto saxophone (track 1), flute (tracks 3, 9), clarinet (track 6), D whistle (tracks 4, 13), low-D whistle (track 13), conch shell (track 8), singing bowl (track 9), sleigh bells (tracks 8, 9), synthesizer (tracks 3, 5, 7, 9, 12, 13), synth (track 10), high throat singing (track 9)
Roy "Future Man" Wooten - Synth-Axe Drumitar, acoustic percussion, Zendrum (track 1), vocals (tracks 4, 12), throat singing (track 9)
Victor Wooten - Fodera 4 string electric bass (tracks 1–5, 7, 8, 10, 13), Compito 5 string fretless electric bass, (tracks 6, 9, 11, 12), synth pedal (tracks 4, 7)

Production notes
Béla Fleck with the Flecktones
Robert Battaglia – engineer, mixing
Richard Dodd – mastering
Frank Ockenfels – photography
Christopher Austopchuk – art direction
Giulio Turturro – design

Chart positions

References

Béla Fleck and the Flecktones albums
2006 albums
Grammy Award for Best Contemporary Jazz Album